The 2014 ICC World Cricket League Division Four was a cricket tournament which took place from 21 June to 28 June 2014. It formed part of the ICC World Cricket League and qualification for the 2019 Cricket World Cup.

Singapore hosted the event.

Teams
The teams that took part in the tournament were decided according to the results of the 2012 ICC World Cricket League Division Four, the 2013 ICC World Cricket League Division Three and the 2014 ICC World Cricket League Division Five.

Venues

 Kallang Ground
 Singapore Cricket Club Ground
 Indian Association Ground

Squads

Round robin

Points table

Matches

Playoffs

5th-place playoff

3rd-place playoff

Final

Statistics

Most runs
The top five run scorers (total runs) are included in this table.

Source: Cricinfo Most Runs

Most wickets
The top five wicket takers (total wickets) are listed in this table.

Source: Cricinfo Most wickets

Final placings

After the conclusion of the tournament the teams were distributed as follows:

References

https://web.archive.org/web/20140606214643/http://www.icc-cricket.com/news/2014/media-releases/80481/icc-announces-schedule-match-officials-and-final-squads-for-pepsi-icc-wcl-div4
https://web.archive.org/web/20140529103752/http://cricket.dk/landsholdet-til-den-vigtige-icc-world-cup-singapore/

2014, 4
2014 in cricket
International cricket competitions in Singapore
2014 in Singaporean sport